The Qingyi River is a tributary of the Ying River in Henan province, China.

References

Rivers of Henan